The Lebanon national beach soccer team represents Lebanon in international beach soccer competitions and is controlled by the Lebanon Football Association, the governing body for football in Lebanon.

In 2016 Lebanon achieved third place at the 5th Asian Beach Games, beating Afghanistan 9–5 at the bronze medal match. This became the first medal in an official competition in the history of the Lebanese Football Association for any men's national team (football, futsal and beach soccer). They have also managed two fourth place finishes in a row at the AFC Beach Soccer Asian Cup, in 2015 and 2017, narrowly missing out on the FIFA Beach Soccer World Cup both times.

Competitive record

FIFA Beach Soccer World Cup

AFC Beach Soccer Asian Cup

Asian Beach Games

WAFF Beach Soccer Championship

Players

Current squad
The following 12 players were called up for the 2019 AFC Beach Soccer Championship.

See also

 Football in Lebanon
 Lebanon national football team
 Lebanon national futsal team

References

Asian national beach soccer teams
National sports teams of Lebanon